Greta Zozula is an American cinematographer, based in New York City. She is best known for her work on Materna, Light from Light, The Half of It, and Never Goin' Back.

Career
Zozula graduated from the School of Visual Arts joined the International Cinematographers Guild in 2013.

Filmography

Awards and nominations

References

External links 

 

Living people
American women cinematographers
American cinematographers
Year of birth missing (living people)
21st-century American women